David Cordani (born 1966) is an American business executive. He has served as the President of Cigna HealthCare since 2005 and President and Chief Operating Officer of Cigna Corporation since 2008.

Personal background 
David Cordani was born in 1966. He completed his undergraduate studies at Texas A&M University and earned an MBA from the University of Hartford.

Professional background 
Cordani started working at Cigna in 1991. Cordani has served as President of Cigna HealthCare since July 2005 and has been President and Chief Operating Officer of Cigna Corporation since June 2008. In 2011, he received a total compensation of $19.09 million, encompassing $1 million in direct salary, $9.3 million in non-equity incentives, $5.8 million in restricted stock awards, and $2.99 million in "other compensation”.

References 

1966 births
Living people
University of Hartford alumni
20th-century American businesspeople
American chief executives of Fortune 500 companies